= Ruddy Buquet =

French football referee

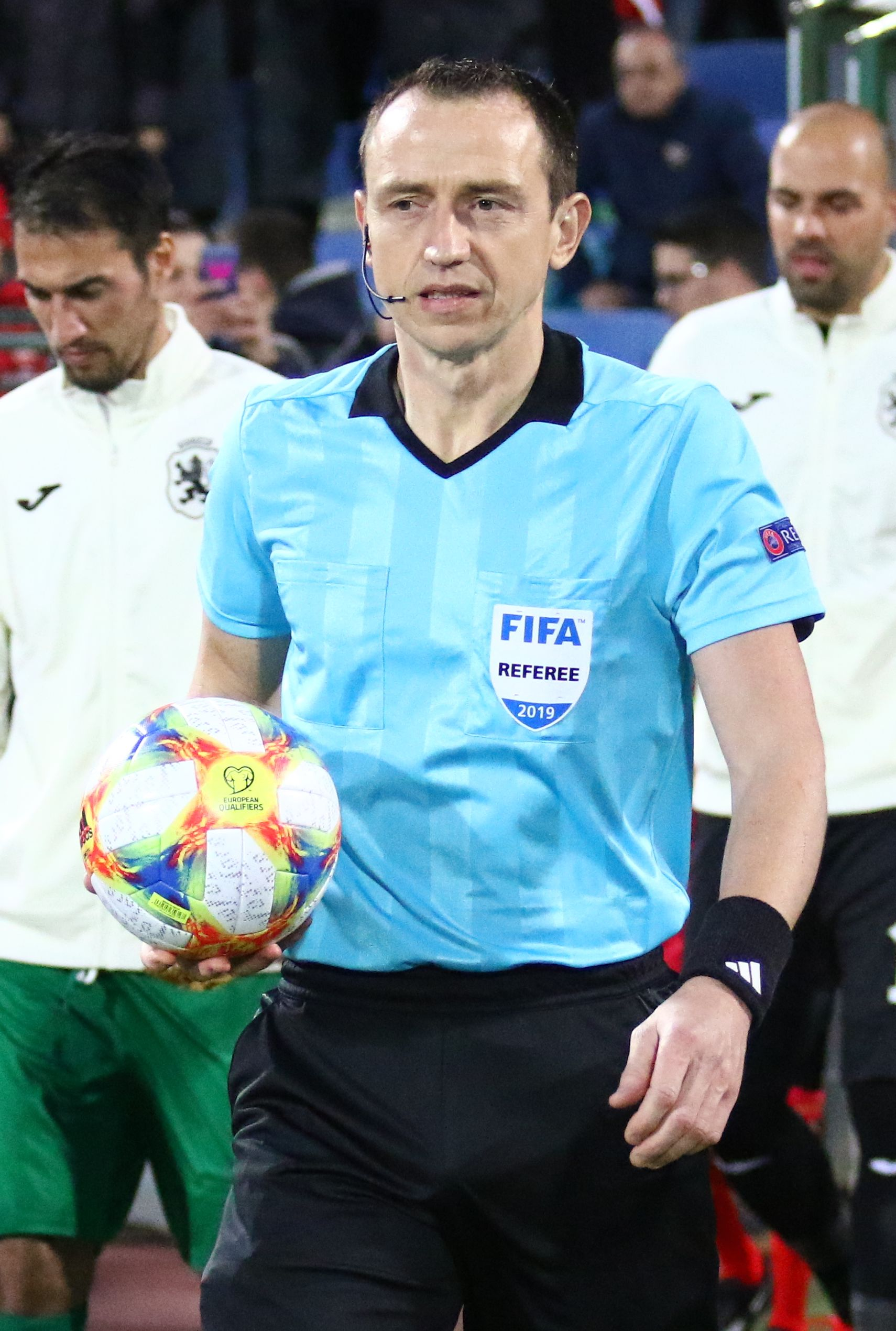
- Buquet in 2019
- Born: 29 January 1977 (age 49); Amiens, Somme, France
- Other occupation: Commercial agent

Domestic
Years	League	Role
2005–2008	Ligue 2	Referee
2008–present	Ligue 1	Referee

International
Years	League	Role
2011–present	FIFA listed	Referee

Ruddy Buquet (born 29 January 1977) is a French professional football referee.
